Sidney Thompson is an American author and academic, who teaches at Texas Christian University.

Life
Born in Memphis, Tennessee, he received his B.A. in English from the University of Memphis (while attending the University of Mississippi to study under Barry Hannah), his M.F.A. in creative writing from the University of Arkansas, and his Ph.D. from the University of North Texas. Writing within the Southern and Southwestern traditions, he draws his multicultural and satirical themes and characters from history and mores in ways that have been compared to Larry McMurtry and R.E.M.

His major works include Sideshow: Stories, recipient of the 2006 Foreword INDIE Silver Award for Short Story Collection of the Year, and a trilogy of historical novels about the African-American deputy U.S. marshal Bass Reeves. Follow the Angels, Follow the Doves: The Bass Reeves Trilogy, Book One is the recipient of the 2021 International AAHGS Book Award for Historical Fiction: Event/Era, a finalist for the 2021 Spur Award for Historical Novel by Western Writers of America, the 2021 Oklahoma Book Award for Fiction by the Oklahoma Department of Libraries, the Will Rogers Medallion Award for Western Fiction, the 2021 Next Generation Indie Award for Historical Fiction (Pre-1900s), and the Peacemaker Book Award for Best First Western Novel by Western Fictioneers, and was named a 2020 Arkansas Gem by the Arkansas Center for the Book. Follow the Angels includes the chapter "Thataway," which received the Creative Writing Award in 2018 from the Western Literature Association. Hell on the Border: The Bass Reeves Trilogy, Book Two was a finalist for the 2021 National Indie Excellence Award for Historical Fiction.

Bibliography
Hell on the Border: The Bass Reeves Trilogy, Book Two (Bison Books, 2021) 
Follow the Angels, Follow the Doves: The Bass Reeves Trilogy, Book One (Bison Books, 2020)
You/Wee: Poems from a Father (Prolific Press, 2018)
Sideshow: Stories (River City Publishing, 2006)

References 

1965 births
Living people
American male novelists
Novelists from Tennessee
21st-century American novelists
American male poets
21st-century American male writers
21st-century American poets
American historical novelists
21st-century American short story writers
University of North Texas alumni
American male short story writers
University of Memphis alumni
University of Arkansas alumni
Texas Christian University faculty
Writers from Memphis, Tennessee
Poets from Tennessee